Hīhītahi was a station on the North Island Main Trunk line, in the Rangitikei District of New Zealand, in the Hautapu River valley. The station served the settlement of Hīhītahi, which was big enough to have a store and a school.

Name 
Hīhītahi means the first rays of the sun. When opened on 1 July 1908 the station was Tarangarere, changed to Turangaarere on 15 April 1909 and to Hihitahi on 21 August 1910.

Until 25 October 1928 the crossing sidings to the south were called Gardner & Sons Siding, or Gardners Siding but then took the former name of its northern neighbour, Turangaarere, later becoming Turangarere.

History 
A service road to help with building the railway was formed in 1887, when the route was first surveyed. The Public Works Department (PWD) had the rail and telegraph lines through Hīhītahi built by 1906. NZR took it over as a flag station on 1 July 1908, when the railhead from the south was extended from Mataroa to Waiouru.

A plan for the proposed station was made in 1903. Tenders were invited on 4 March 1907. On 7 June 1907 a contract was let to A S Johnston of Hunterville for £2,201.0s.7d and the station was built by January 1908. Cottages for railway staff were built from 1904 to 1955. A crossing loop could take 54 wagons and a snowplough was kept at the station.

The station lost its passenger trains before 1972 and closed to all traffic on 31 January 1982.

Bridges to Waiouru 
Between Hīhītahi and Waiouru the railway has four bridges over the Hautapu River. They are made up of spans of -

 , 2 x  and 4 x 
  and 7 x ,
 2 x  and 4 x 
 , 3 x  and 2 x 

The 66 ft spans were latticed girders, and the others plate girders.

Tramways 
There were at least three tramway networks in the area, which took timber to sawmills and the railway. Gibbs & Trevor had a tramway running west from the station and George Gardner had tramways to the north west. They had a 1927 Type Cb 0-4-4-0 built by A & G Price. In 1906 a tramway ran to the PWD siding and next  year, W G Irvine applied to run one beside the railway. Quin Bros siding was noted in 1909 and, in 1910, owners of the Hawera Sash & Door Co Ltd, had a  tramway linking their logging area to their mill and the railway. They used a 1909 Type A 0-4-0 T built by J. Johnston's Vulcan Foundry at Invercargill and a 1914 0-4-4-0 by G & D Davidson Ltd. of Hokitika. The tramways were dismantled about 1934, when the bush had been cleared.

Incidents 
In 1940 a boulder, estimated to weigh 120 tons, slipped onto the line just north of the station, derailing K-Class locomotive, No.919. KA-Class No.945 suffered a similar crash in 1961.

Slips in 1935 and 1945 closed the line for several days.

References

External links 
 Report on 2008 derailment at crossing loop

Photos -

 1905 view of a cutting being dug with pick, shovel and wheelbarrow
 Railway buildings in 2017
 Station building  in 2018
 Google street view of railway buildings in 2019

Railway stations in New Zealand
Rail transport in Manawatū-Whanganui
Buildings and structures in Manawatū-Whanganui
Railway stations closed in 1982
Railway stations opened in 1908
Rangitikei District